Chhatak (formerly known as Chhatak Bazaar) is a town in northeastern Bangladesh, on the Surma River in Chhatak Upazila of Sunamganj District in the division of Sylhet.

Further reading
 
 Cement Americas

Populated places in Sunamganj District